"You're Going Out of My Mind" is a song written by Wayland Holyfield and Jerry McBee, and recorded by American country music artist T. G. Sheppard.  Originally recorded for the 1984 album One Owner Heart, it was released in March 1985 as the only single from the album T. G..  The song reached number 10 on the Billboard Hot Country Singles & Tracks chart.

Chart performance

References

1985 singles
1984 songs
T. G. Sheppard songs
Songs written by Wayland Holyfield
Song recordings produced by Jim Ed Norman
Warner Records singles
Curb Records singles